The evening grosbeak (Hesperiphona vespertina) is a passerine bird in the finch family Fringillidae found in North America.

Taxonomy
The IOC checklist and the Handbook of the Birds of the World place the evening grosbeak and the closely related hooded grosbeak in the genus Hesperiphona. However, the Clements Checklist and the AOS checklist place the evening and hooded grosbeaks in the genus Coccothraustes with the hawfinch.

The genus Hesperiphona was introduced by Charles Lucien Bonaparte in 1850. The name is from Ancient Greek hesperos, "evening", and phone "cry", and the specific vespertina is Latin for "evening".

Description
The evening grosbeak is similar in appearance to the Eurasian hawfinch, both being bulky, heavily built finches with large bills and short tails. The adult has a short black tail, black wings and a large pale bill. The adult male has a bright yellow forehead and body; its head is brown and there is a large white patch in the wing. The adult female is mainly olive-brown, greyer on the underparts and with white patches in the wings.

Breeding and ecology
The breeding habitat is coniferous and mixed forest across Canada and the western mountainous areas of the United States and Mexico. It is an extremely rare vagrant to the British Isles, with just two records so far. The nest is built on a horizontal branch or in a fork of a tree.

The migration of this bird is variable; in some winters, it may wander as far south as the southern U.S.

These birds forage in trees and bushes, sometimes on the ground. They mainly eat seeds, berries, and insects. Outside of the nesting season they often feed in flocks. Sometimes, they will swallow fine gravel.

The range of this bird has expanded far to the east in historical times, possibly due to plantings of Manitoba maples and other maples and shrubs around farms and the availability of bird feeders in winter.

Gallery

References

External links

 Evening Grosbeak - Coccothraustes vespertinus - USGS Patuxent Bird Identification InfoCenter
 
 
 
 
 
 
 
 
 

evening grosbeak
Birds of North America
Birds of Canada
Native birds of the Western United States
Birds of Mexico
Birds of Saint Pierre and Miquelon
evening grosbeak
evening grosbeak
Articles containing video clips
Extant Pleistocene first appearances
Birds of the Sierra Madre Occidental